Esteban Javier Dreer Gianneschi (born November 11, 1981 in Godoy Cruz) is an Argentine-born naturalised Ecuadorian footballer who plays for L.D.U. Portoviejo of the Ecuadorian Serie A.

In May 2011, Dreer set an Ecuadorian Serie A record for most consecutive games played by a goalkeeper. Since 29 November 2009, Dreer has consecutively played 5,700 minutes in 63 matches.

International career

Argentine-born Dreer has played football in Ecuador spanning back to 2009 with Deportivo Cuenca. He became a naturalized Ecuadorian citizen and became eligible for the Ecuador national football team. He made the cut for the final 23 squad for 2015 Copa América.

Dreer made his debut on November 17, 2015 in a 2018 FIFA World Cup Qualifier against Venezuela.

References

External links
 Argentine Primera statistics at Fútbol XXI 
 Dreer's FEF player card 

1981 births
Living people
Sportspeople from Mendoza Province
Ecuadorian footballers
Ecuador international footballers
Argentine footballers
Ecuadorian people of Argentine descent
Sportspeople of Argentine descent
FBK Kaunas footballers
C.D. Cuenca footballers
Arsenal de Sarandí footballers
C.S. Emelec footballers
L.D.U. Portoviejo footballers
Ecuadorian Serie A players
Association football goalkeepers
2015 Copa América players
Copa América Centenario players
Naturalized citizens of Ecuador
Expatriate footballers in Lithuania